Tafadzwa Dube is a Zimbabwean professional footballer, who formerly played as a goalkeeper for Lancashire Steel F.C and Harare City F.C. He is also former player of the CAPS United F.C.

International career
In January 2014, coach Ian Gorowa, invited him to be a part of the Zimbabwe squad for the 2014 African Nations Championship. He helped the team to a fourth-place finish after being defeated by Nigeria by a goal to nil.

References

External links

1984 births
Living people
Zimbabwean footballers
2014 African Nations Championship players
2011 African Nations Championship players
Masvingo United F.C. players
Dynamos F.C. players
Gunners F.C. players
F.C. Platinum players
CAPS United players
Harare City F.C. players
Manica Diamonds F.C. players
Association football goalkeepers
Zimbabwe international footballers
Yadah Stars F.C. players
Zimbabwe A' international footballers